0 Avenue (Zero Avenue) is a road in the Lower Mainland, British Columbia straddling the Canada–United States border, stretching from Surrey to Abbotsford. The road runs parallel to the physical border between the two countries.

Boundary Road on the US side runs for 1.5 miles along 0 Avenue and again one mile to the west, with many cameras watching the border, before the U.S. road ends at the Lynden–Aldergrove Border Crossing. 0 Avenue continues west along the northern border of Peace Arch Historical State Park to Peace Arch Crossing. Small pedestrian bridges cross a trench on the border. At the eastern end of 0 Avenue, the road turns north.

The road is a haven for smugglers, even though the border controls have tightened up since the September 11 attacks. The first known drug tunnel along the Canada–United States border was found east of the Lynden–Aldergrove crossing in 2005. Some asylum seekers have also tried to move to Canada from the U.S. via 0 Avenue.

During the COVID-19 pandemic, restrictions on cross-border travel made 0 Avenue a meeting place for several cross-border couples. Once restrictions were lifted, some of these couples married at Peace Arch Park, a transnational park between Blaine and Surrey.

Major intersections

In popular culture
Zero Avenue, a CBC Television series on popular culture that aired from 1994-97, took its title from this road.

References

External links
 

Canada–United States border
Transport in Abbotsford, British Columbia
Transport in Langley, British Columbia (district municipality)
Transport in Surrey, British Columbia